The 1946 Georgia Tech Yellow Jackets football team was an American football team that represented the Georgia Institute of Technology in the Southeastern Conference (SEC) during the 1946 college football season. In their second season under head coach Bobby Dodd, the Yellow Jackets compiled a 9–2 record (4–2 against SEC opponents) and outscored all opponents by a total of 284 to 127. They were ranked No. 11 in the final AP Poll and defeated the Saint Mary's Gaels in the 1947 Oil Bowl.

Five Georgia Tech players received honors from the Associated Press or United Press on the 1946 All-SEC football team: center Paul Duke (AP-1, UP-1); quarterback Frank Broyles (AP-1, UP-2); tackle Bob Davis (AP-1, UP-2); guard Bill Healy (UP-1); and fullback George Matthews (UP-3).

Schedule

After the season

The 1947 NFL Draft was held on December 16, 1946. The following Yellow Jackets were selected.

References

Georgia Tech
Georgia Tech Yellow Jackets football seasons
Georgia Tech Yellow Jackets football